Dark Intelligence is a 2015 science fiction novel by Neal Asher. The story is set in the Polity universe and focuses on the dark (corrupted) AI Penny Royal. The plot follows several characters, each searching for Penny Royal for different reasons and culminates in a clash around the world of Masada. The plot is closely linked to that of Asher's 2011 novel The Technician. The main protagonist is Thorvald Spear, a new character to Asher's novels, who  has been reanimated in a cloned body after his mind storage crystal was recovered over a century after his death. As the novel develops it becomes clear that Spear's memories have been adjusted allowing the character to serve as an unreliable narrator.

References

2015 British novels
2015 science fiction novels
British science fiction novels
Pan Books books